BG Stadium is a three-sided football stadium in Thanyaburi, Pathum Thani, Thailand, holding 10,114  spectators. It is the home of BG Pathum United of the Thai League 1. The stadium has been certified by the International Football Federation (FIFA) and by the Asian Football Federation (AFC) as A-Class football stadium. Since opened, the ground has been installed with high-quality artificial surface. However, from the season 2018 onward the stadium was replaced with real grass.

In addition to being the home of BG Pathum United, it was also used to organize international competitions for the Thailand national football team including the important football cup matches in Thailand.

Photos

References

External links
Stadium information

Football venues in Thailand
Buildings and structures in Pathum Thani province